Ahmed Shihab-Eldin (Arabic: أحمد شهاب الدين) (born September 16, 1984) is an American-Kuwaiti of Palestinian descent. He has become known for championing freedoms of Palestinians, as well as other marginalized groups who are demanding dignity and equality. He is also a journalist and columnist formerly at Huffington Post and VICE. He was a senior reporter for Al Jazeera Plus from 2017 through 2020. He produced an Emmy-nominated documentary. In 2020, he began moving towards other creative pursuits, creating a parody account on the short video platform TikTok and suggesting that he might begin podcasting.

In 2008, he won a Webby Award for master's digital media project, "Defining Middle Ground: The Next Generation of Muslim New Yorkers.” He also promotes LGBT and other human rights on his social media and journalism.

In 2023 he presented Queer Egypt Under Attack for BBC News focussing on the treatment of LGBT people in Egypt.

References

Kuwaiti journalists
American bloggers
American male journalists
American Muslims
American people of Kuwaiti descent
American people of Palestinian descent
Columbia University Graduate School of Journalism alumni
HuffPost writers and columnists
Living people
1984 births